Arthur George Poyser (13 February 1915 – 5 August 1986) was an Australian politician. Born in Ballarat, Victoria, he was educated at state schools in Geelong, after which he became a textile worker and tramway worker. He served in the military 1940–1941. From 1961 to 1966 he was Secretary of the Geelong Trades Hall Council. In 1966, he was appointed to the Australian Senate as a Labor Senator for Victoria, filling the casual vacancy caused by the death of Senator Charles Sandford. The Australian Constitution dictated that a special Senate election had to be held at the same time as the lower house 1966 election; Poyser and the Country Party's James Webster, appointed after the death of Harrie Wade, were required to stand for election. Both were successful. Poyser was re-elected in 1967 and 1974, remaining in the Senate until his retirement in 1975.

He died at his home in Geelong in 1986, aged 71.

References

1915 births
1986 deaths
Australian Labor Party members of the Parliament of Australia
Members of the Australian Senate for Victoria
Members of the Australian Senate
Textile workers
20th-century Australian politicians